Hendersonville Presbyterian Church (originally Beech Cumberland Presbyterian Church) is a church located in Hendersonville, Sumner County, Tennessee. The congregation was organized in 1798 by Thomas Craighead, and the first Synod of Cumberland Presbyterian Church was constituted on October 5, 1813. The Gothic Revival stone structure was erected in 1828. The adjoining cemetery contains the bodies of pioneer surveyor William Montgomery and Revolutionary War veteran John McMurtry. The building still stands and is in use today.

References
Sumner County Fact Book 2007-2008. The News Examiner & The Hendersonville Star News. 2007.

Buildings and structures in Sumner County, Tennessee
Presbyterian churches in Tennessee